Ghana's Ministry of Food and Agriculture (MOFA) is the government agency responsible for the development and growth of agriculture in the country. The jurisdiction does not cover the cocoa, coffee or forestry sectors.

Structure of MOFA
The ministry is headed by the Minister for Agriculture and his three deputies. The deputies are in charge of the following: 
Deputy Minister in charge of Fisheries
Deputy Minister in charge of Crops
Deputy Minister in charge of Livestock

Functions of MOFA
The ministry's roles include the following:
Formulation of appropriate agricultural policies to aid the agricultural sector.
Planning and co-ordination of various development projects in the agricultural sector.
Monitoring and evaluation of the projects and programmes instituted to assess their progress.

Objectives
Agriculture in Ghana is recognised as the mainstay of the economy with a greater impact on poverty reduction than other sectors. It is also critical for rural development and associated cultural values, social stabilisation, environmental sustainability and buffer during economic shocks. Based on the role of agriculture in the national development framework, Food and Agriculture Sector Development Policy (FASDEP II) has the following as its objectives:

 Food security and emergency preparedness
 Improved growth in incomes
 Increased competitiveness and enhanced integration into domestic and international markets
 Sustainable management of land and environment
 Science and Technology Applied in food and agriculture development
 Improved institutional Coordination

Departments and agencies

DP Membership – Agric Sector working Group 

 African Development Bank (AfDB)
 Agence français de développement (AFD – France)
 Alliance for Green Revolution for Africa (AGRA)
 Canadian International Development Agency (CIDA)
 Engineers Without Borders (EWB)
 EMBRAPA
 Food and Agricultural Organization of the UN (FAO)
 German Development Cooperation (GIZ-KfW)
 International Food Policy Research Institute (IFPRI)
 International Fund for Agricultural Development (IFAD)
 International Water Management Institute (IWMI)
 Japan International Corporation Agency (JICA)
 Japan International Research Centre for Agricultural Science (JIRCAS)
 Millennium Challenge Corporation (MCC)
 United States Agency for International Development (USAID)
 World Bank (WB)
 World Food Programme (WFP)

Projects Of The Ministry Of Food And Agriculture
 PFJ (Planting For foods And Jobs) This a five-year contract which is made to increase the production of crops in Ghana. and decrease the importation of food. This project as well is meant to provide job opportunities for the youth of the country. A training workshop was organized in collaboration with Peasant Farmers Association of Ghana on 2021 PFJ implementation guidelines for farmers.

See also
 Agriculture in Ghana
 Ministry of Fisheries and Aquaculture Development

References

Agriculture
Ghana
Ghana
Agricultural organisations based in Ghana